Newport Library may refer to:

 Newport Central Library, city of Newport, South Wales, United Kingdom
 Newport Public Library, Newport, Rhode Island, United States
 Newport News Public Library, Newport News, Virginia, United States
 Warren-Newport Public Library District, Lake County, Illinois, United States